Heineken and United African Company (UAC) began construction of the Sierra Leone Brewery Limited in October 1961 in Wellington Industrial Estate in Freetown and the first brew was mashed-in on 23 November 1962. The first brand to be brewed was Star Lager.

It closed for six months in 1982 following a shortage of foreign exchange, reopening after the end of the rainy season. During the 1997 Military Coup the brewing stopped for six months after the brewery was ransacked.   On 6 January 1999 the rebel forces looted the brewery, stopping production for one and a half years.

Products
 Star Lager - Pale Lager (launched in 1962)
 Amstel 
 Guinness Foreign Extra Stout 7.5% ABV (launched in 1967)
 Mützig Lager (October 2013)
 Salone Beer (made of 100% sorghum)
 Maltina (Alcohol-free)
 Trenk Dark Malt Energy Drink

Community investment
In 2006 a program was started to encourage local farmers to grow sorghum as part of a local sourcing drive.
The current target of the local sourcing program is to achieve receive 60% of raw materials from within Africa.
The production of Salone Beer, made with 100% sorghum, has created a reliable source of income to over 12,000 farming families.

References

External links 
 https://www.sierraleonebrewery.com/
 http://www.theheinekencompany.com

Companies based in Freetown

Breweries of Africa
Heineken subsidiaries